Cantharis nigra is a species of soldier beetles native to Europe.

References

Cantharidae
Beetles described in 1774
Taxa named by Charles De Geer
Beetles of Europe